The Eurovision Song Contest has had a long-held fan base in the LGBT community, and Eurovision organisers have actively worked to include these fans in the contest since the 1990s.

LGBT participants 
Katrina Leskanich, who won representing the United Kingdom as lead singer of the group Katrina and the Waves later came out. Victoria De Angelis, a member of the  Italian winning band Måneskin, is openly bisexual, with fellow band member Ethan Torchio defining himself as "sexually free". 

Deen, who represented Bosnia and Herzegovina in 2004, has never put out a statement confirming being homosexual, but is openly sharing his life with boyfriend Will Phearson III on social media.

In 2011, the United Kingdom was represented by Blue. Members Duncan James and Lee Ryan are gay and bisexual, respectively.

In 2016, Israel was represented by Hovi Star who is openly gay. Douwe Bob, who represented the Netherlands, is bisexual.

Slavko Kalezić, who represented Montenegro in 2017, is openly gay.

Saara Aalto, who represented Finland in 2018, is a lesbian. Mélovin, who represented Ukraine, came out as bisexual in 2021.

Bilal Hassani, who represented France in 2019, is queer. Tom Hugo, who represented Norway as a member of the group Keiino, is openly gay.

Other 2021 participants who are LGBT include Montaigne from Australia and Blas Cantó from Spain, who are bisexual, Lesley Roy from Ireland, who is a lesbian, Vasil Garvanliev from North Macedonia, Jeangu Macrooy from the Netherlands and Jendrik Sigwart from Germany, who are gay, and Roxen from Romania, who is non-binary. Hulda Kristín Kolbrúnardóttir, a singer in the band Gagnamagnið, who represented Iceland, is pansexual.

In 2022, Iceland was represented by the band Systur, who are trans rights activists alongside their work in music. One member, Elín, is a genderfluid lesbian, while Sigga has a transgender son. During the voting segments, the group waved a transgender flag alongside the Icelandic flag in the green room. Israel and Australia were represented by Michael Ben David and Sheldon Riley respectively, who are both gay.

In 2023, Belgium will be represented by Gustaph, who identifies as a member of the LGBT community, and Norway will be represented by Alessandra Mele, who is bisexual. Serbia will be represented by Luke Black who is gay.

Several presenters of the Eurovision Song Contest have also identified as LGBT, including Assi Azar, who hosted in Israel in 2019, and Nikkie de Jager, who hosted in the Netherlands in 2021. De Jager was the first transgender person to host the contest. Mika, who is gay, hosted the 2022 edition in Italy. Graham Norton, who is also gay, will host the final of the 2023 edition in the United Kingdom.

LGBT themes in competing acts 
Past competing songs and performances have included references and allusions to same-sex relationships. One of the contest's earliest winning songs, Luxembourg's 1961 winner "Nous les amoureux", was confirmed by its performer Jean-Claude Pascal as containing references to a homosexual relationship and the difficulties faced by the pair, considered controversial during the early 1960s when in many European countries homosexual relations were still criminalised. 

Krista Siegfrids' performance of "Marry Me" at the  featured a same-sex kiss with one of her female backing dancers. Ireland's stage show of Ryan O'Shaughnessy's "Together" in  featured two male dancers portraying a same-sex relationship. In , the Lithuanian entry featured a kiss between two men and two women in the background.

Several drag performances have featured in Eurovision performances, including Austria's Conchita Wurst, Ukraine's Verka Serduchka, Denmark's DQ and Slovenia's Sestre; the latter's selection sparked protests and debate on LGBT rights in Slovenia at the time and resulted in concerns raised at the European Parliament ahead of Slovenia's upcoming accession to the European Union.

Criticism of LGBT visibility 
Dana International's selection for the 1998 contest in Birmingham was marked by objections and death threats from Orthodox religious sections of Israeli society, and at the contest her accommodation was reportedly in the only hotel in Birmingham with bulletproof windows.

In more recent years, various political ideologies across Europe have clashed in the Eurovision setting, particularly on LGBT rights. Turkey, once a regular participant in the contest and a one-time winner, first pulled out of the contest in 2013, citing dissatisfaction in the voting rules; more recently when asked about returning to the contest Turkish broadcaster TRT have cited LGBT performances as another reason for their continued boycott. After initially planning on airing the 2013 contest, TRT eventually pulled its broadcast of the event in response to Krista Siegfrids's same-sex kiss. It has also been reported that LGBT visibility in the contest was also a deciding factor when  chose not to enter the 2020 contest amid a rise in anti-LGBT sentiment in the Hungarian government of Viktor Orbán, although no official reason has been given by the Hungarian broadcaster MTVA.

Following the introduction of a "gay propaganda" law in Russia in 2013, as well as developments in Ukraine, the 2014 contest saw a marked increase in booing from the audience, particularly during the Russian performance, getting qualified to the final, and during the voting when Russia received points. Conchita Wurst's win in the contest was also met with criticism on the Russian political stage, with several conservative politicians voicing displeasure in the result. In response to the booing, the producers of the 2015 contest installed "anti-booing technology" for the broadcast, and the contest's presenters repeatedly called on the audience not to boo; the Russian participant, Polina Gagarina, was interviewed by Conchita in the green room during a break in the voting, and attracted criticism from Russian conservatives when she posted a backstage video to social media of herself hugging Conchita.

Clashes on LGBT visibility in the contest have also occurred in countries which do not compete in the contest. The live broadcast of the first semi-final featured censorship by Mango TV of Ireland's Ryan O'Shaughnessy, whose performance reportedly went against Chinese guidelines that prohibit "abnormal sexual relationships and behaviours" due to the same-sex dancing, as well as Albania's Eugent Bushpepa due to the open display of tattoos, which broke guidelines around the featuring so-called "sub-cultures" and "dispirited cultures". As a result of the termination, the Chinese broadcaster was unable to broadcast the second semi-final or the grand final of the 2018 contest or any future contests.

References 

Sources:

 Doron Braunshtein, Why do gay men love the Eurovision : the philosophy and rationale behind the obsessive love of the gay community for the Eurovision Song Contest , 2019

External links 
 
 

Eurovision Song Contest
Eurovision Song Contest